Education in Kenya refers to the education system in Kenya. It is considered a basic right that should be offered to every individual. Education in Kenya predates to as early as the 18th century among the Swahili people. The earliest school was established by missionaries in Rabai. During the colonial era, the number of Kenyans with exposure to education steadily increased and a good number of them were privileged to proceed abroad for further education.

Kenya has manoeuvered through three education curriculums since independence with the latest being, the Competency-Based Curriculum, rolled out in 2017 to replace the 8-4-4 Curriculum that has been in practice since 1985.

Even though efforts have been put in place to promote basic education, with illiteracy levels still high among the Kenyan population. Poverty, teenage pregnancy, truancy, drug abuse, among others, all affect the literacy levels of prospective pupils.

2017, Kenya's education system was rated as the strongest among other forty three mainland countries on the African continent by the World Economic Forum. In the following year 2018, the World Bank also ranked Kenya as the top African country for education outcomes.

History 
Historical records, not only from the travels of Johann Ludwig Krapf and Johannes Rebmann, reveal that Swahilis had access to education as far back as 1728 with a Swahili manuscript Utendi wa Tambuka (Book of Heraclius) attesting to the fact. The CMS missionaries interacted with locals in the coastal town of Mombasa and set up one of the earliest mission schools in the country at Rabai in 1846.

With the expansion of the railway from Mombasa to Uganda, the missionaries expanded their work into Kenya's interior. An attempt to set up a school and mission at Yatta in 1894 was resisted by the Kamba tribe. The missionaries then penetrated into western Kenya and set up schools and missions. The first school in western Kenya was established at Kaimosi in 1903. During the colonial era, the number of Kenyans with exposure to education steadily increased and a good number of them were privileged to proceed abroad for further education.

Among those who furthered their education abroad in the colonial era were Jomo Kenyatta, who attended Woodbrooke College and London School of Economics, Charles Njonjo, who attended Gray's Inn Law School, Peter Mbiyu Koinange, who attended Columbia University, Mwai Kibaki who attended London School of Economics, R. Mugo Gatheru who attended Roosevelt University, Tom Mboya, who attended Ruskin College, Oxford, Masinde Muliro, who attended University of Cape Town, Julius Gikonyo Kiano who attended Stanford University, and Barack Obama Sr., who attended the University of Hawaii at Manoa.

Julius Gikonyo Kiano was the first Kenyan to obtain a PhD. The trend steadily rose over the years and by the time of independence in 1963, 840,000 African children were attending elementary school.

The earliest schools in Kenya 

 School at Rabai near Mombasa – established 1846
 The Prince of Wales now Nairobi School established 1902.
 Friends School Kaimosi, now Kaimosi Friends Primary School, established in 1903
 Maseno School, established in 1906
 Government Indian School or The Duke of Gloucester School, now Jamhuri High School, established 1906
 Tumutumu Mission School, now Tumutumu Girls' High School established in 1908.
 European Girls' School, now Kenya High established 1908
 Kabaa Boys High School, Machakos County established 1923
 Waa High School, Kwale County established 1923
 Kenton College, established 1924 Kijabi 1935 Kileleshwa
 Mang'u High School, established 1925.
 Kapsabet High School, established 1925.
Kakamega High School, Established 1925.
 Alliance School, now Alliance High School (Kenya) established in 1926.
 Nakuru High School, established in 1927.
 St. Mary's School Yala, established in 1927.
 Hill School Eldoret established in 1928
 Highlands High School, now Moi Girls' High School – Eldoret established in 1928.
 Kitale Primary, later Kitale Academy, now Kitale School established 1929
 Kisii School, established in 1932
 Mugoiri Girls High School in Muranga (formerly Gaiteiguru Intermediary School) established in 1938
 Kangaru schools, established in 1947
 European Boys' School, Duke of York, now Lenana School, established 1949
 Kapsisiywa was attained after two years of high school at that time distinct from secondary school with students sitting for the East African Advanced Certificate of Education (EAACE).

7–4–2–3 System 
With the collapse of the East African community in 1977, Kenya continued with the same system of education but changed the examination names from their regional identity to a national identity. The East African Certificate of Primary Education became the Certificate of Primary Education (CPE), the first time the C.P.E was marked by a computer system, the East African Certificate of Education became the Kenya Certificate of Education (KCE) and the East African Advanced Certificate of Education became the Kenya Advanced Certificate of Education (KACE).

8–4–4 Curriculum 

In 1985, President Daniel arap Moi introduced the 8–4–4 system of education, which adopted 8 years of primary education, 4 years of secondary education and 4 years of university education. With the introduction of the 8–4–4 system CPE became KCPE (Kenya Certificate of Primary Education) while KCE became the Kenya Certificate of Secondary Education (KCSE).

Since 1985, public education in Kenya has been based on an 8–4–4 system, with eight years of primary education followed by four years of secondary school and four years of college or university. To date, there has been steady growth in the advancement of education in the country which boasts of a great number of public and private universities as well as middle-level colleges.

Competency Based Curriculum (CBC), 2-6-3-3-3 
In 2017, the Competency-Based Curriculum (CBC) was launched to replace the traditional 8–4–4 system introduced by the President Moi in 1985. The Competency-Based Curriculum was designed by the Kenya Institute of Curriculum Development (KICD) with the aim of churning out 'engaged, empowered and ethical citizens'.

Unlike the 8-4-4 system where learners would spend 8 years in primary education, 4 years in secondary School and 4 years at the university, the CBC curriculum runs on a 2-6-3-3-3 System of Education where basic education has been organized in three levels; Early Years Education, Middle School Education, and Senior School.

Under CBC, learners will now spend 2 years in Pre-primary, 6 years in Primary (Grade 1–6), 3 years in Junior Secondary (Grade 7, 8, 9), 3 years in Senior Secondary (grade 10,11,12) and 3 years in university.

The Competency-Based Curriculum puts emphasis on seven core competences namely; communication and collaboration, critical thinking and problem-solving, creativity and imagination, citizenship, digital literacy, learning to learn and self-efficacy.

According to KICD, the traditional curriculum is teacher-centered while the CBC is learner-centered.

Learners are constantly assessed on the seven competencies based on the following areas; Meeting Expectations (ME), Approaching Expectations (AE) and Below Expectations (BE).

The first cohort of learners under the CBC curriculum will clear Primary Education in 2022. They are expected to transition to junior high school in early 2023.The government has through the ministry of education been investing in developing the infrastructure required in public schools across the country to accommodate the junior high-schoolers.

In October 2021, President Uhuru Kenyatta directed the National Treasury to avail KSh.8 billion/= to the Education Ministry for the construction of 10,000 classrooms in secondary schools across the country by 2023. According to Education Cabinet Secretary Prof George Magoha, 700 new CBC junior classrooms had been completed within secondary schools as at February 2021. Consequently, CBC has been a top priority funding area in the  KSh.126.3 billion/= supplementary budget, submitted in parliament mid February by Treasury Cabinet Secretary Ukur Yattani.

According to the Kenya Institute of curriculum Development (KICD), students transitioning to Junior secondary schools will be between the ages of 12 and 14.

British Curriculum 
Some private schools, however, offer a system of education similar to the British system of education with ordinary level exams, "O-levels", taken at the end of four years of secondary school and advanced levels, "A-levels", taken after two years of high school. This is effectively the same as the 7-4-2-3 system described above.

Transition rates and Overall Performance 
Out of all children in Kenya, about 85% attend primary school. 75% of those who complete primary education will proceed to secondary schools and 60% of those who complete secondary school will proceed to institutions of a higher level of education, including business and vocational institutions, national polytechnics, public and private universities within the country. Over 950,000 Kenyans have furthered their education abroad with a majority of graduates primarily from India, the United Kingdom, Canada, the United States, Russia, and Uganda.

Education quality 

Education quality has recently received a lot of attention in Kenya. The Kenyan government's primary document influencing this effort, the Kenya Education Sector Support Program for 2005–2010, established the National Assessment Centre (NAC) to monitor learning achievement. In 2010, the NAC released the results of its first assessment.

In 2009, in collaboration with the NAC, Uwezo Kenya conducted an assessment of the basic literacy and numeracy skills of children ages 6–16. The Annual Learning Assessment (ALA) reached villages in 70 out of 158 districts in Kenya and assessed nearly 70,000 children in their homes. The ALA was set at a Standard 2 level, which is the level where students are supposed to achieve basic competency in reading English and Kiswahili and complete simple arithmetic problems. The chart below shows the percent of children who could not read a Standard 2 level paragraph or solve Standard 2 level subtraction problems:

Key findings about education in Kenya, based on the results of the Uwezo 2009 assessment:

 Literacy levels are low, and are substantially lower in certain regions. Girls tend to perform better in reading English and Kiswahili, while boys tend to perform better in math.
 Literacy levels are lower in public schools than private schools.
 Most children can solve real world, "ethno-mathematics" problems, while fewer can solve similar math problems in an abstract, pencil and paper format.
 5% of children are not enrolled in school, but the problem is far worse in particular regions.
 About half of children are enrolled in pre-school.
 Many children are older than expected for their class level, including 40% of children in class 2, and 60% of children in class 7.
 North Eastern Province and arid districts in Rift Valley and Eastern Provinces have particularly low performance; and many older children, especially girls, are not attending school.
 Many families pay for extra tuition, which focuses heavily on drilling and exam preparation.
 Schools struggle to plan their budgets because they receive funds at unpredictable times.
 Children whose mothers are educated, particularly beyond primary school, tend to have much higher rates of literacy and numeracy.
 About 15% of students are absent on a given day, with much higher absenteeism in certain districts as a result of increased poverty level.
 There is a severe shortage of teachers, estimated at 4 teachers per school.
 The reluctance of the government to invest in educational institutions in marginalized areas thereby developing schools in cities only which result in inefficient education process in arid and semi-arid areas
 Embezzlement of public funds by school administrators and lack of accountability of the use of government grants and high levels of corruption in educational institutions

Due to the mentioned problems in public education, private school are soaring in popularity, even among families that can ill afford school fees.

Early Childhood Development education 
Early Childhood Development (ECD) education or Pre-primary education is a foundation for later learning and development and it targets children aged 0–5 years with a focus on igniting the child's potential for lifelong adaptability, innovation and communication skills while imparting in them the values of responsible citizenship and respect for diversity. ECD is classified into three different clusters i.e.
 Baby-class
 Nursery school
 Pre-unit
 

Between the years of 2003-2007, the educational sector strategic plan and implementation plan committed to eliminating poverty as an educational development hindrance, promoting human rights through provisions of education, and attaining sustainable development of quality basic education for all. This implementation is a positive step towards education access in Kenya.  One of the first steps to access education is at the early childhood development (ECD), primary, and secondary levels.  The government assessed the high need for a change in access due to half of the population being composed of young people. According to Achoka et al. (2007), 20% of these people are under the age of five years old. ECD implementation is crucial in the school systems because the ages of 0-5 and key developmental years. While the children are rapidly developing, they are also the most vulnerable to environmental factors and influences. An effective ECD programme could create a beneficial foundation for further education and training. Between the years 1992 and 2002 there was a 68.9% increase in the number of ECD centers.

Accessibility concerns in ECD education 
The accessibility of education is influenced by four main factors: poverty, regional and gender disparities, policy framework, and the HIV/AIDS pandemic. In 2002, roughly 56% of the population lived in poverty. The people living in these conditions are also unable to acquire proper dietary needs, medical needs, and a clean and stable habitat. The children who are born into these conditions are predisposed to the disadvantaged access of education specifically to ECD. Not only can this influence their access to education, it can also influence their growth and development. While the government tries to offer some support, a majority of the costs associated with education are covered solely by the parents. Many of the families that are living in poverty are unable to afford to send their children to school.

Geographically, Kenya is very varied and diverse. Northern Kenya are Arid and Semi-Ari Lands (ASALs), but the Central and Western areas are wetlands. Although the government has attempted to achieve accessible education for all citizens, many of the people living in the ASAL regions are continuously moving in search of Wetlands for their families and their livestock. Due to the constant migrations, their lifestyles create conflicts in education access as they are not in an area for long enough to begin the schooling process for their children in the required ECD education. Additionally, there have been land/tribal conflicts which results in families being exiled or parents being killed. The children in these conditions remain unsupported for any education needs as the parents cannot afford it. Connected to the geographical barriers are the cultural barriers in Kenya as well. Although the government attempts to provide equal educational opportunities regardless of gender, some parents focus their attention and resources on males and their education since they are seen as more of an asset to their family. As a result, more males than females are enrolled in ECD programs which creates a gender disparity. 

Another area of concern in ECD education is the lack of adequate policy framework which has created inconsistent and unmeasurable curriculum. This has a major effect on the children's primary education entry behavior. The group that is most affected by this are the poverty-stricken parents in rural communities. Managing these behaviors are left to the abilities of the educators, but in some areas, the extent of ECD education is processed in rooms called “academies.”  Many of the teachers/caregivers in the academies may not have any training. With a variety of factors, some of these centers are not productive learning environments and make it extremely difficult to detect children with special needs. 

In recent years, the HIV/AIDS epidemic has been a concern for the citizens living in Kenya as it does not spare children. Many children who have HIV/AIDS are born to infected parents who transfer it to them. A majority of those children die within their first five years of life. The infant mortality rate and under-five years mortality rate has significantly increased in recent years. Since it affects a large percentage of the population, this could directly influence the numbers of ECD centers available.

Primary education 
Primary education marks the beginning of the 8-4-4 Curriculum. It begins at the age of 5 to 7 after completion of a year of kindergarten commonly known as nursery school or pre-unit. The first class or year of primary school is known as Standard 1, the final year as Standard 8 and primary school children are known as pupils. The school year at both primary and secondary levels, begins in January and ends in November. Students get 3 school vacations in April, August and December.

At the end of the school year, students advance to the next grade. Since repetition was banned students still progress to the next grade even though they fail their examinations. Most primary schools are day schools with pupils living at home. Fewer schools at primary level are boarding schools compared to secondary schools. All public primary school pupils sit for the Kenya Certificate of Primary Education examination at the end of the school year in Standard eight. In primary school, students are taught English, Kiswahili and Indigenous language activities.

 Lower primary: This is a 4-year period that marks the first transition into the mainstream primary education system. and starts at ages 6 or 7. The grading system is called "standard", meaning the first four years the students transitions from standard one, through four.
 Upper primary: This is also a 4-year period that helps prepare the students for the high school years. At standard 7, the students become more aware of which high schools they want to attend. During the last year of the primary school system, students are allowed to select 4 to 6 secondary schools that they would like to attend including one national school and take the KCPE, which validates their transition to high school.

Universal Primary Education (UME), an international development goal created by the World Conference on Education, has led to Kenya's target of universal primary education for all citizens. Since 2003, enrollments have increased drastically and today Kenya has much closer rates of enrollment to first world countries, such as the United States. In January 2003 President Mwai Kibaki re-introduced free primary education which previously existed before the mid-80s when the government adopted cost-sharing measures that led to a minor level of school fees charged by primary schools for textbooks, PTA, and extracurricular activities. Since 2003, education in public schools became free and compulsory (Kenya Constitution, Article 53, 2010). On learning that primary education had once again become free in Kenya, Kimani Maruge, an uneducated farmer and the world's oldest person to enrol in primary school joined Kapkenduiywo primary school in Eldoret at the age of 84. He was elected head boy at the age of 86 in 2005.

Secondary education 
Secondary schools in Kenya fall into three categories: government-funded, Harambee and private. Government-funded schools are divided into national, provincial and district levels. Harambee schools do not receive full funding from the government and private schools are run by private organizations or individuals. After taking the primary school leaving exam and successfully passing, government-funded schools select students in order of scores.

Students with the highest scores gain admission into national schools while those with average scores are selected into provincial and district schools. Harambee schools accept students with low scores. Students who fail their examinations pursue technical and vocational education. The latter is divided into technical secondary school (lasting 4 years) and apprenticeships solutions. Since 2010, technical secondary schools student can have access to university programmes. A number of students also drop out of school by choice due to poor scores.

Under the current system, students attend secondary school for four years before sitting for the school-leaving exam at the end of the fourth year. The first-class or year of secondary school is known as form 1 and the final year is form 4. At the end of the fourth year, from October to November students sit for the Kenya Certificate of Secondary Education examination. In 2008, the government introduced plans to offer free Secondary education to all Kenyans.

Historic prestigious national high schools include Mang'u High School, Alliance High School (Kenya),Lenana School and Starehe Boys' Centre and School. Private secondary schools in Kenya are generally high cost, offering students an alternative system of education with better or more luxurious facilities compared to public schools. They are often favoured for prestige. Most private schools in Kenya offer the British system of education which includes "O-levels" and "A-levels". Very few offer the American system of education and a good number of them offer the Kenya system. Some of the oldest private schools in Kenya include Loreto Convent Msongari, Nairobi (1921), St. Mary's School, Nairobi, Braeburn School, Consolata School, Strathmore School, Oshwal Academy, Rift Valley Academy, Aga Khan Academy, Kenton College and Brookhouse School,

KCSE grading requirements

Subject grouping
The average grade is based on performance in seven subjects. Where a candidate sits for a minimum seven and a maximum of nine subjects, the average grade is based on the best seven subjects. The grade assigned to the candidate depends on how well he has performed in all the seven ranked subjects. The subjects are grouped and among those seven chosen Group 1 is compulsory, Group 2 must be at least 2, Group 3 must be at least 1, Groups 4 and 5 are optional.

Grading system
 Mean grading

 Subject grading

 Grade P – This grade denotes that the results are pending due to infringement of entry requirements. For instance, the candidate did not key in the correct index number or involved in some for form of forgery.
 Grade X – This grade is awarded to a candidate who did not sit for one or all the papers that they registered for. In that case, the student will not be graded and will be awarded Grade X. This grade will automatically be awarded when total points scored by candidate fall below 7. A candidate will also be awarded Grade X if they did not sit minimum required subjects in grades 1, 2 and 3. However, the candidate can be graded (Grade A – E) after skipping for the final exams in any subjects in Grades 4 and 5, provided they sat for at least seven subjects in grades 1, 2 and 3, but their certificate and transcript will indicate Grade X in that particular subject.
 Grade W – A candidate is awarded this grade on suspicion of exam malpractice. The examination board will conduct further investigation before grading or cancelling the results of the candidate.
 Grade Y - After exam irregularities are proven, the candidate will be awarded Grade Y. The candidate may face prosecution and will have to resit the examination with the next cohort.

University matriculation is based on the best eight and performance in particular subjects relevant to degree courses.
For instance:
{| class="wikitable"
|-
!  Subject
!  Group
!  Grade
!  Points
|-
| English
| 1
| B+
| 10
|-
| Kiswahili
| 1
| A-
| 11
|-
| Mathematics
| 1
| A
| 12
|-
| History & Government
| 3
| B
| 9
|-
| Geography
| 3
| A-
| 11
|-
| Physics
| 2
| B+
| 10
|-
| Chemistry
| 2
| B-
| 8
|-
| Biology
| 2
| A-
| 11
|}

The total number of points is 74: which is a mean grade of A-. Chemistry has not been used in the ranking, as maximum number of subjects that can be used in final ranking are seven. This student qualifies for direct admission in a Public University. Training institutions and faculties and departments determine their own minimum entry requirements. 

The number of students admitted to public universities through the Kenya Universities and Colleges Central Placement Service (KUCCPS), prior to 2012 known as Kenya Universities Joint Admissions Board (JAB), depends on the total number of beds available in all the public universities. Nonetheless, those who miss out but attained the minimum university entry mark of C+ or C with a relevant diploma certificate are admitted through the parallel degree programs (module II) if they can afford the full fees for the course.

Students who manage a grade of C+ qualify to do a degree course at the university. Owing to the competition, and fewer places at the university, those with B and in a few cases B−, and above are taken for degree courses at the public universities and benefit by paying government-subsidized fees. The rest join private universities or middle-level colleges.

This has been the subject of much discussion with people questioning the rationale and morality of locking out qualified students from public institutions yet still admitting those who come from financially able families.

Technical and Vocational Education and Training Institutions 
These institutions operate under the state department of vocational and technical training under the helm of a principal secretary. Current PS is Kevit Desai.

They award artisan, craft and diploma and higher national diploma certificates after successful completion of relevant courses. Courses offered by these institutions include Business Education, Accounting, Secretarial Studies, Nursing, Teacher Training, Computer Studies, Journalism, Media, Design, Culinary Studies, Foreign Languages, Tourism and Engineering. In order of credibility or accreditation, national polytechnics rank first, followed by government training institutes, teacher training colleges and private institutions. Although generally termed colleges, these institutions do not award degrees. Degrees are only awarded by Universities and Technical Universities.

Government TVET institutions
There are three types of government TVET institutions in Kenya. these are National Polytechnics, Technical Institutions and Vocational Education Centers (formerly Youth Polytechnics) 
Notable Institutions include:
 Technical University of Kenya
 Technical University of Mombasa
 The Sigalagala National Polytechnic
 Rift Valley Technical Training InstituteS

University education 

There are 48 universities in Kenya, 22 of which are public and 26 private. The University of Nairobi is the oldest public university in Kenya while KAG East university is the oldest among the private universities.

While education accessibility has been of major importance at the primary and secondary levels in Kenya, the attempt of making education accessible has not been implemented at the higher education level, which leaves students from a lower socioeconomic status at a disadvantage compared to those of a higher socioeconomic status. In recent years there has been an increase in the cost of higher education worldwide, and there is no exception for Kenya which is limiting access to specific socioeconomic groups and those from different regions and ethnic groups since it favors and is more accessible to those who can afford it. There are very few students from disadvantaged backgrounds attending higher education institutions which is a reflection of the society and the quality of prior education. There are many social inequalities present in Kenya which have a direct impact on education such as: disparities in distribution of national income, security, and employment, levels of investment, health care, and public services are also evident across populations, genders, and ethnic groups. In an observation done by the Society for International Development, in 2004 10% of Kenya's population controlled about 42% of the national income while 10% contents with significantly less than 1%. The poverty gap has widened so significantly that the top 1% is making approximately $1,204 per month while the rest of the population is making approximately $181 per month. 

Immediately after independence, Kenya's public higher education was free for all students regardless of their socioeconomic status; it was fully funded by the government. This created a high demand for higher education which raised a concern for donor agencies. At that time, the demand was continuously increasing, but Kenya's economy was not improving, so the government established a cost sharing and cost recovery model. In the cost sharing model, the government would cover part of the cost, but the remaining cost was the institutions and families responsibility. After this change, the student loan scheme was introduced. It was the responsibility of the Higher Education Loans Board (HELB) to pay out loans to Kenyan students that are interested in attending a higher education institution; there have been concerns that the loans are not being distributed equitably which has not fully improved the higher education access issues. Kenya has also explored the Module II admissions plan. In this plan, the admitted students must pay their full tuition fees but also pay an amount that is equivalent to attending a private institution. This has widened the accessibility gap for families of lower socioeconomic status as they will not be able to pay the amount of tuition, so higher education remains unaffordable and inaccessible for those students. 

Due to the current policies and financial requirements, educational access is limited to students who perform highly in academics and those who do not. If students are academically inclined and perform well in their primary and secondary education institutions, the educational fees and increasing tuition costs cause them to be unable to attend a higher education institution. Cost sharing has created an even larger gap in accessibility for students; continuing similar policies will keep creating a larger gap.

Digital accessibility in university education 
There has been a recent focus on digital accessibility after the COVID-19 pandemic. In a study done by Githinji et al. (2022), there was a focus on the accessibility of digital content in Kenya. This was done at the higher education level. The study found that one of the major challenges in accessibility was the internet connectivity for both educators and students. In many areas in the country, there are not the necessary resources or funds to be able to purchase a device to access digital content.

Public universities and their constituent colleges

Public universities

Private universities 

There are 3 categories of private universities: chartered universities – fully accredited universities, by the Commission for Higher Education; universities, which had been offering degrees long before the establishment of the Commission for Higher Education; and universities authorized to operate with Letters of Interim Authority (LIA).

Chartered universities 
 Strathmore University.
 Mount Kenya University.
 University of Eastern Africa, Baraton.
 United States International University Africa (USIU-A).
 Catholic University of Eastern Africa – CUEA.
 Daystar University.
 Kabarak University.
 Riara University.
 KAG East University
 Kenya Methodist University.(KeMU)
 Africa Nazarene University.
 St. Paul's University.
 Kenya Methodist University.
 Pan Africa Christian University.
 Scott Christian University.
 Maasai Mara University.
 Kenya Highlands Evangelical University. Formerly Kenya Highlands Bible College – KHBC
 Great Lakes University of Kisumu
 Africa International University (formerly NEGST)
 KCA University
 Adventist University of Africa (Rongai).
 Pan Africa Christian University
 University Of Eastern Africa, Baraton
 Aga Khan University.

Universities with Letters of Interim Authority (LIA) 

 Kiriri Women's University of Science and Technology.
 Presbyterian University of East Africa.
 Gretsa University.
 The East African University
 UMMA University
 Management University of Africa
 Riara University
 Pioneer International University
RAF International University
 Adventist University
 Inoorero University
 GENCO University

Universities operating with Certificates of Registration 
 The Nairobi International School of theology

Teacher education 
Most universities in Kenya have a teacher training programme, and the B.Ed. programmes often have the most students compared to other programmes. Kenya's population is growing, which in turn means that the demand for teachers is growing; however, there is often a shortage of teachers due to budget issues in schools. 
There are four different levels of teacher education. Early childhood development teacher education, which is available as a certificate or 2-year diploma, requires 300 hours of teaching practice. Primary teacher education is a 2-year programme in which teachers-in-training practice teaching in four sessions of three weeks. A variety of subjects are studied. Diploma teacher education is a 3-year programme. Teacher trainees in this programme take a wide variety of subjects. The undergraduate bachelors programme is a 4-year programme; trainees study 2 different subjects. 
All teaching programmes require teaching practice in which a teacher trainee prepares for lessons and teaches the lesson while being assessed on their preparation and the teaching itself. Mentor teachers at the school work with administration and supervisors to assess the teacher trainee. 
One challenge to teacher education in Kenya is a lack of experienced teacher educators who have knowledge of both the content and pedagogy. Additionally, some of the teacher educators of primary programmes were themselves trained at the secondary level, so they do not possess the knowledge of primary education necessary.

Access to education 
In 2003, the government launched the Free Primary Education programme (FPE), which abolished primary school fees for all children. Previously, school fees, uniform costs, and textbook costs were a substantial barrier to education for many, especially considering the rate of poverty and economic inequality in Kenya. The aim of FPE was to remove these barriers to education and ensure that more children with low socioeconomic status are able to access schooling. 
Despite the goals of FPE to improve equitable education for all, analysis of the Kenya Certificate of Primary Education (KCPE) examination scores showed that counties with high enrollment impact and improved KCPE scores were in the arid and semi-arid area, while counties with high enrollment impact and lower KCPE scores were in coastal areas. 

FPE led to an increased number of students who could attend school. It also led to an increase in the number of private schools, and it resulted in a larger teacher-student ratio in schools. Despite more students per teacher, researchers found that the implementation of FPE resulted in only slightly decreased test scores in those who would have finished primary school regardless of FPE. Overall, FPE succeeded in increasing access to primary school.

Students with disabilities 
The Free Primary Education programme secured equal rights for children with disabilities and set aside funding for schools with students with disabilities. Still, by 2005 less than 10% of children with disabilities had access to schooling. 
In 2010, a new constitution was adopted by Kenya which ensured that children with disabilities have the right to a free and compulsory education. Also in 2010, the National Special Needs Education Policy Framework was adopted by the Kenyan government to ensure that students with disabilities have access to good education. The objectives of this framework include early identification and intervention, increasing public awareness, supporting research, and providing adequate facilities. Despite the strong intentions of this framework to make education accessible for children with disabilities, by 2018 the framework had not been fully implemented. It is not uncommon for policies to remain unimplemented after adoption in Kenya; this may be due to a lack of available government funds. 

Prior to the adoption of Free Primary Education, only four categories of disability were recognized: hearing impaired, mentally handicapped, physically handicapped, and visual impaired. After Free Primary education was adopted, autism, cerebral palsy, and Down syndrome were included in the disability categories. The National Special Needs Education Policy Framework further expanded the list of recognized disability categories to twenty-two, including orphaned students, the internally displaced, and nomadic students. 
There have been strides made in helping students with disabilities access an equitable education, but challenges remain. Few teachers are trained in special education. Referral and assessment services do not receive adequate funding, and not all schools have access to these resources. Additionally, there is a cultural stigma on people with disabilities in Kenya. The stigma and marginalization on people with disabilities is particularly acute in rural areas. 

Mobile devices are seeing some success as assistive technology for the visually impaired in Kenya. Approximately 1.4% of Kenyans may be visually impaired, and students who are visually impaired have less access to textual works. There are six schools for the blind in Kenya, but only two of them offer secondary education. Only two universities admit visually impaired students, and the majors open to them are limited because of a lack of assistive technology resources. However, mobile devices are very common in Kenya, and one study found that distributing mobile devices to students made it easier for students with visual impairments to access education. Students were able to type notes, record lectures, have text read to them, and easily communicate with classmates and professors via email.

Women's access to education 
In 2008, the national secondary education expansion programme was put in place. This programme reduced school fees at the secondary level and increased class sizes, thereby expanding access. This policy resulted in an increase of educational attainment by women by 0.75 years. It also reduced the chance of a first childbirth by age 19 and age 20 by about 30%, and it reduced the chance of first marriage by age 16 and age 18 by 40% and 20% respectively. This hints that being able to continue secondary education reduces behaviors that could stop women from pursuing education. Higher education for women is associated with benefits for both women and their future children.

Factors affecting education in Kenya 

In 2003 the Kenyan government promised free primary education to its citizens. In the early 70s primary school fees were abolished but in the mid 80s cost-sharing measures between the government and its citizens led to the re-introduction of minor fee charges by primary schools. As the trend continued with schools requiring parents to pay fees such as PTA, harambee, textbooks, uniforms, caution fees, exam fees and extracurricular activity fees, most parents became overburdened and unable to raise such fees. Those who could not afford the money to pay for their children's school fees often had their children drop out of school. Many children were also forced to drop out of school when teachers would not allow them to take exams. To pressurize parents to pay fees, schools often sent children home during the final exams.

The growth of Kenya's education sector has exceeded expectations. After the first university was established in 1970, six other public universities and 23 private universities have been established. Although Kenya has its own universities, some parents prefer to send their children to universities outside the country. This is largely because Kenyan public universities are not as flexible with admission requirements as some foreign universities. Another factor that has been pointed out is that youth with disabilities are facing major obstacles to progress in higher education, and measures as affirmative action or measures tailored to the needs of particular profiles of students could play a relevant role in this.

Literacy 
In a 2020 study on literacy published in Early Education and Development, researchers found that mothers and fathers in Kenya do not spend much time reading and storytelling with their children. This may be explained by the low level of education attained by the mostly rural participants in the study; it could also be explained by the amount of time these families need to spend on subsistence activities. However, one-third of other household members did read to children living in the same household, which had a positive effect on early childhood literacy.

See also 
 Aiducation
 Kenya National Examination Council
 List of universities and colleges in Kenya.
 List of schools in Kenya
 Gender disparities in Kenyan education
 National Library Service of Kenya
 TVET schools s in kenya

References 

14. List of Primary Schools in Kenya

External links 
Kenyan State-institutions
 Ministry of Education website
 Commission of Higher Education – Kenya

Data & reports from external institution

 Education Statistics and Quality of Education in Kenya, Southern and Eastern Africa Consortium for Monitoring Educational Quality (SACMEQ)
 CIA factbook, Kenya
 World Data on Education-Kenya, IBE(2010) – Overview and statistics of the Kenyan Education system
 Vocational Education in Kenya, UNESCO-UNEVOC(2012)- Overview of the vocational education and training system in Kenya
 https://unesdoc.unesco.org/ark:/48223/pf0000250431